Irving Rameses Rhames (born May 12, 1959) is an American actor. He is known for his supporting roles as IMF Agent Luther Stickell in the Mission: Impossible film series and gang kingpin Marsellus Wallace in Pulp Fiction. He also appeared in Jacob's Ladder (1990), Dave (1993), Striptease (1996), Con Air (1997), Only in America (1997), Out of Sight (1998), Entrapment (1999), Bringing Out the Dead (1999), Dawn of the Dead (2004), I Now Pronounce You Chuck & Larry (2007), Jamesy Boy (2014). He voiced Cobra Bubbles in the animated films Lilo & Stitch (2002), Stitch! The Movie (2003), and Leroy & Stitch (2006).

Early life and education
Rhames was born and raised in Harlem, New York City. He was named "Irving" after NBC journalist Irving R. Levine.

Rhames entered New York's High School of Performing Arts, where he developed his love of acting. After high school, he studied drama at SUNY Purchase, where fellow acting student Stanley Tucci gave him his nickname "Ving". Rhames later transferred to the Juilliard School's Drama Division (Group 12: 1979–1983) where he graduated with a Bachelor of Fine Arts degree in 1983.

Career
Rhames first appeared on Broadway in the play The Boys of Winter in 1984. He started out in film in Wes Craven's The People Under the Stairs (1991) as Leroy, watched over Kevin Kline as Secret Service agent Duane Stevensen in Dave (1993), and played Marsellus Wallace in Pulp Fiction (1994). He also played Buddy Bragg in Out of Sight (1998).

Rhames played Dr. Peter Benton's brother-in-law on the TV medical drama ER, a recurring role he filled for three seasons. He played ace computer hacker Luther Stickell opposite Tom Cruise in Brian De Palma's Mission: Impossible (1996). In 1997, Rhames portrayed the character of Nathan 'Diamond Dog' Jones in the popular film Con Air, and Muki in the Ice Cube film Dangerous Ground.

Rhames won a Golden Globe in 1998 for Best Actor – Miniseries or Television Film in HBO's Don King: Only in America. At the ceremony he gave his award to fellow nominee Jack Lemmon, saying, "I feel that being an artist is about giving, and I'd like to give this to you." Lemmon was clearly touched by the gesture as was the celebrity audience who gave Lemmon a standing ovation. Lemmon, who tried unsuccessfully to give the award back to Rhames, said it was "one of the nicest, sweetest moments I've ever known in my life." The Hollywood Foreign Press Association announced later that they would have a duplicate award prepared for Rhames. That moment was #98 on E!'s 101 Awesome Moments in Entertainment. The New York Times lauded Rhames for the act, writing that in doing so he "demonstrated his capacity for abundant generosity."

Rhames appeared in Striptease (1996) as the wisecracking bodyguard Shad, Jesus-praising paramedic Marcus in Bringing Out the Dead (1999), and reprised his Luther Stickell role for Mission: Impossible 2 (2000). He played Johnnie Cochran in American Tragedy (2000), the ex-con boyfriend of Jodie's mother in the John Singleton film Baby Boy, portrayed a gay drag queen in the television film Holiday Heart, contributed his voice for the character of Cobra Bubbles in Lilo & Stitch (2002) and the subsequent TV series, and played a stoic cop fighting zombie hordes in Dawn of the Dead (2004) and Day of the Dead (2008) remakes. Rhames has also appeared in a series of television commercials for RadioShack, usually performing with Vanessa L. Williams.

In March 2005, Rhames played the lead role on a new Kojak series, on the USA Network cable channel (and on ITV4 in the UK). The bald head, lollipops, and "Who loves ya, baby?" catchphrase remained intact, but little else remained from the Telly Savalas-starring original.

Rhames voiced the part of Tobias Jones in the computer game Driver 3.

Reprising his Luther Stickell role, Rhames co-starred in Mission: Impossible III (2006), had a cameo appearance in Mission: Impossible – Ghost Protocol (2011), and played a major role in Mission: Impossible – Rogue Nation (2015) and Mission: Impossible – Fallout (2018), the fifth and sixth installments in the Mission Impossible film series, respectively. He is the only actor besides Tom Cruise to appear in all six Mission: Impossible films. It was announced that he would have a role in the Aquaman-based show Mercy Reef; however, due to the integration of The WB and UPN for the new network, CW, Mercy Reef was not picked up. Rhames played a homosexual – and possibly also homicidal – firefighter who comes out of the closet in I Now Pronounce You Chuck and Larry. He narrates the BET television series American Gangster.

In the 2008 film Saving God, he played an ex-con who is released from prison a changed man, looking to take over his father's former church congregation in a deteriorating neighborhood. Rhames stars in Phantom Punch, a biopic of boxer Sonny Liston, released directly to DVD, as well as The Tournament, portraying a fighter out to win a no-rules tournament.

Rhames makes an appearance in Ludacris's song "Southern Gangstas" on his album Theater of the Mind. Rappers Playaz Circle and Rick Ross are also featured on the track.

He filmed the film The Red Canvas with Ernie Reyes Jr., UFC lightweight contender Gray Maynard, and Randy Couture. In 2010, he filed a lawsuit against the film's producer, claiming that he had only been paid $175,000 of a $200,000 contract.

In 2015, he filmed a series of commercials for The ADT Corporation.

Rhames is one of the narrators for UFC.

Rhames narrated the team introductions for the New England Patriots and Atlanta Falcons in Super Bowl LI in February 2017.

Since 2014, Rhames has provided the narration for numerous Arby's commercials, with the slogan "Arby's: We have the meats!"

Personal life
Rhames is a Christian.  As of 2018, he resides in Santa Monica, California. He has been married to Deborah Reed since 2000.

Filmography

Film

Television

Video games

Awards and nominations

Notes

References

External links

 
 

1959 births
Living people
Male actors from New York City
American male film actors
American male stage actors
American male voice actors
Best Miniseries or Television Movie Actor Golden Globe winners
Juilliard School alumni
African-American male actors
American male television actors
Fiorello H. LaGuardia High School alumni
21st-century American male actors
20th-century American male actors
People from Harlem
20th-century African-American people
21st-century African-American people
State University of New York at Purchase alumni